Jean Agélou (16 October 1878 – 2 August 1921) was a French photographer of the 1910s and 1920s, best known for his erotic and nude photographs made at the beginning of the 20th century. Agélou was born in Alexandria, Egypt, in October 1878.

Christian Bourdon and Jean-Pierre Bourgeron, major collectors of postcards, have endeavored to collect as complete a collection of his work as they could.

Biography
Not much is known about Agélou's private life, except that after 1908 Fernande was his lover and model. She was a prostitute whose full name is believed to be Fernande Barrey (1893–1960). She would also model for painters Amedeo Modigliani and Chaïm Soutine, and would also become a painter in her own right.

The 1900s marked a golden age of erotic photography, but photographers still had to exercise discretion and he signed his works "JA". It took a long time before the true name of "JA" became known.

He began publishing his work in the magazine L'Étude académique, which was theoretically intended for artists, but that had 20,000 subscribers, and subsequently published his own postcards. The age of his models ranged from 20 to 24 years, and one was only 14 years, which was legal under the law of 16 March 1899. Besides postcards, Agélou also produced stereoscopic images, although these are more rare. He photographed with both a regular camera and a stereo camera during a session with a model.

Nudity in photographs was banned in France on 7 April 1908. Nudity disappeared from all journals and stock images were retouched, a veil or small providential panties were added and pubic hairs were brushed out. Nude images began to circulate clandestinely and producers had to act with discretion. Erotic pictures of Fernande were cherished by soldiers on both sides of the First World War. Erotic postcards and magazines had to be sold or shipped in sealed envelopes. Agélou's original nude prints became available again in the early 1970s, except in Japan where they were still banned.

Jean Agélou died in 1921 in a car accident with his brother George, at the age of 42 years. George had taken care of business aspects and Jean found the models and did the photography. The photographs were made in the studio and natural light, the backdrops were made by painters who painted the decors.

See also

 Erotic photography

References

Bibliography

External links
 sicharmantes.com : A crowdfunding project which offers real photographic prints. Prints will be realized with the genuine Jean Agélou's negatives.
 Various Photos from Jean Agelou  * link is broken
 History of erotic postcards * link is broken
 Fernande Berry, Photography by Jean Agélou* link is broken
 Miss Fernande on Stereoscopy History

French photographers
French erotic photographers
Portrait photographers
Artists from Alexandria
1878 births
1921 deaths
Road incident deaths in France
French expatriates in Egypt